Cristo del Pacífico, "the Christ of the Pacific", is a  statue of Jesus erected in Lima, Peru, in 2011. Its erection was a gift from a consortium of Brazilian companies to the city of Lima, under former President Alan García, and described as a parting gift to the nation on occasion of his leaving office after the 2011 presidential election. It was inspired by the Christ the Redeemer statue in Rio de Janeiro.

Height

At  including its pedestal, and  without, the statue is smaller than the Christ the Redeemer statue in Rio de Janeiro, which measures ,  without its pedestal.

See also
 List of statues of Jesus

References

Buildings and structures in Lima
Colossal statues of Jesus
2011 sculptures